Malayalam cinema is a part of Indian cinema based in Kerala dedicated to the production of motion pictures in the Malayalam language. It is sometimes known by the nickname "Mollywood" by certain media outlets. The 1983 film Aa Rathri was the first Malayalam film to cross ₹1 crore. The 1991 film Kilukkam was the first Malayalam film to cross ₹5 crore. The 1995 film The King was the first Malayalam film to cross ₹10 crore. The 2005 film Rajamanikyam was the first Malayalam film to cross ₹25 crore. The 2013 film Drishyam was the first Malayalam film to cross ₹50 crore and ₹75 crore. The 2016 film Pulimurugan was the first Malayalam film to cross ₹100 crore and 150 crores mark.

List of highest-grossing  films worldwide

Highest-grossing films by year

See also
 List of highest-grossing Indian films
 List of highest-grossing South Indian films
 List of highest-grossing films in India

References

Malayalam cinema
Lists of highest-grossing films by region